Shine is Cancer Research UK's night-time walking marathon which uses light as a symbol of hope and the progress being made in the fight against cancer.

It is a unique fundraising event where those taking part can choose which cancer they want to beat and raise money for that area of cancer research.

In 2011 there will be Shine events in three cities in the UK - Glasgow, Manchester and London.

See also 
Race for Life
List of health related charity fundraisers

External links
Shine official site
Cancer Research UK

Cancer fundraisers
Charity events in the United Kingdom
Challenge walks